Lawrence W. Beil (October 25, 1923 – October 25, 1986) was an American football tackle who played one season with the New York Giants of the National Football League. He played college football at the University of Portland and attended Franklin High School in Portland, Oregon.

References

External links
Just Sports Stats

1923 births
1986 deaths
Players of American football from Portland, Oregon
American football tackles
Jefferson High School (Portland, Oregon) alumni
Portland Pilots football players
New York Giants players